Women on the Verge of a Nervous Breakdown is a 1988 Spanish black comedy film written and directed by Pedro Almodóvar, starring Carmen Maura and Antonio Banderas. The film brought Almodóvar to widespread international attention: it was nominated for the 1988 Academy Award for Best Foreign Language Film, and won five Goya Awards including Best Film and Best Actress in a Leading Role for Maura. It debuted at the 45th International Venice Film Festival and was released on 11 November 1988.

Title 
Historically, this condition has been associated with hysteria and more recently in the scientific literature with post-traumatic stress and panic attacks.

Plot
Television actress Pepa Marcos is depressed because her boyfriend Iván has left her. They are voice actors who dub foreign films, notably Johnny Guitar with Joan Crawford and Sterling Hayden. Iván's sweet-talking voice is the same one he uses in his work. About to leave on a trip, he has asked Pepa to pack his things in a suitcase he will pick up later.

Pepa returns home to find her answering machine filled with frantic messages from her friend, Candela; she rips out the phone and throws it out the window onto the balcony. Candela arrives; before she can explain her situation, Carlos (Iván's son with Lucía, his previous lover) arrives with his snobbish fiancée Marisa. They are apartment-hunting, and have chosen Pepa's penthouse to tour. Carlos and Pepa figure out each other's relationship to Iván; Pepa wants to know where Iván is, but Carlos does not know. Candela tries to kill herself by jumping off the balcony.

A bored Marisa decides to drink gazpacho from the fridge, unaware that it has been spiked with sleeping pills. Candela explains that she had an affair with an Arab who later visited her with some friends. Unbeknownst to her, they are a Shiite terrorist cell. When the terrorists leave, Candela flees to Pepa's place; she fears that the police are after her. Pepa goes to see a lawyer whom Carlos has recommended.

The lawyer, Paulina, behaves strangely, and has tickets to Stockholm. Candela tells Carlos that the Shiites plan to hijack a flight to Stockholm that evening and divert it to Beirut, where they have a friend who was arrested. Carlos fixes the phone, calls the police, hangs up before (he believes) they can trace the call, and kisses Candela. Pepa returns; Lucía calls and says that she is coming over to confront her about Iván. Carlos says that Lucía has recently been released from a mental hospital. Pepa, tired of Iván, throws his suitcase out (barely missing him); he leaves Pepa a message.

Pepa returns to her apartment and hears Carlos playing Lola Beltrán's "Soy Infeliz". She throws the record out the window, and it hits Paulina. Pepa hears Iván's message, rips out the phone and throws the answering machine out of the window. Lucía arrives with the telephone repairman and the police, who traced Carlos' call. Candela panics, but Carlos serves the spiked gazpacho. The policemen and repairman are knocked out, and Carlos and Candela fall asleep on the sofa; Lucía aims a policeman's gun at Pepa, who figures out that Iván is going to Stockholm with Paulina and their flight is the one the terrorists are planning to hijack. Lucía says that she faked being sane when she heard Iván's voice dubbed on a foreign film. She throws the gazpacho in Pepa's face, and rushes to the airport to kill Iván.

Pepa chases her in a cab with her neighbour, Ana. At the airport, Lucía sees Iván and Paulina at security and aims her gun at them. Pepa thwarts the murder attempt by rolling a luggage cart at Lucía, before fainting. Iván rushes to Pepa's aid and apologises for the way he has been treating her, offering to talk things out with her. Pepa, however, declares it is now too late and leaves. She returns to her home, which is a mess. Pepa sits on her balcony, where Marisa has just awakened. The women chat, sharing a moment of tranquility, and Pepa finally reveals what she wanted to tell Iván: she is pregnant.

Cast

Reception
 review aggregator Rotten Tomatoes reports that 91% of 33 professional critics gave the film a positive review. Based on 12 critics, it holds an 85/100 rating on Metacritic, signifying "universal acclaim".

The film is ranked #78 in Empire magazine's "The 100 Best Films of World Cinema" list in 2010.

The film was the highest-grossing Spanish film of all-time in Spain with a gross of 1.1 billion pesetas, surpassing La vaquilla (1985), equivalent to US$8 million. It was also the most successful Spanish movie in the United States at the time, with a gross of $7.2 million.

Nils Gollersrud comments that "Almodóvar’s signature formula of gaudy, ironic, genre-bending storytelling had achieved a symbiosis of sorts, presenting a more confident and satisfying version of his unique cinematic vision that his earlier, rougher films had not yet achieved".

Awards and nominations

United States
 Academy Awards
 Nominated: Best Foreign Language Film
 Golden Globe Awards
 Nominated: Best Foreign Language Film
 National Board of Review
 Won: Best Foreign Language Film
 New York Film Critics
 Won: Best Foreign Language Film
 Runner-up: Best Actress (Carmen Maura)

United Kingdom
 BAFTA Awards (UK)
 Nominated: Best Film not in the English Language

Europe 
 David di Donatello Awards (Italy)
 Won: Best Foreign Direction (Pedro Almodóvar)
 European Film Awards
 Won: Best Actress – Leading Role (Carmen Maura)
 Won: Best Young Film (Pedro Almodóvar)
 Nominated: Best Art Direction (Félix Murcia)
 Goya Awards (Spain)
 Won: Best Actress – Leading Role (Carmen Maura)
 Won: Best Actress – Supporting Role (María Barranco)
 Won: Best Editing (José Salcedo)
 Won: Best Film
 Won: Best Screenplay – Original (Pedro Almodóvar)
 Nominated: Best Actor – Supporting Role (Guillermo Montesinos)
 Nominated: Best Actress – Supporting Role (Julieta Serrano)
 Nominated: Best Cinematography (José Luis Alcaine)
 Nominated: Best Costume Design (José María Cossío)
 Nominated: Best Director (Pedro Almodóvar)
 Nominated: Best Makeup and Hairstyles (Jesús Moncusi and Gregorio Ros)
 Nominated: Best Original Score (Bernardo Bonezzi)
 Nominated: Best Production Design (Félix Murcia)
 Nominated: Best Production Supervision (Esther García)
 Nominated: Best Sound (Gilles Ortion)
 Nominated: Best Special Effects (Reyes Abades)
 Venice Film Festival (Italy)
 Won: Golden Osella – Best Screenplay (Pedro Almodóvar)

Stage adaptation

Women on the Verge of a Nervous Breakdown has been adapted into a musical by Jeffrey Lane (book) and David Yazbek (music and lyrics). The production opened on Broadway in previews on 5 October 2010, and officially on 4 November 2010, at the Belasco Theatre. The cast included Patti LuPone, Sherie Rene Scott, Laura Benanti, Brian Stokes Mitchell, Danny Burstein, Mary Beth Peil, Justin Guarini, de'Adre Aziza, and Nikka Graff Lanzarone, with direction by Bartlett Sher.

The production was a limited engagement that was scheduled to end 23 January 2011, but due to low grosses and ticket sales, closed early on 2 January 2011. At the time of closing, the show had played 30 previews and 69 regular performances.

The show later ran in London's West End at the Playhouse Theatre, with television star Tamsin Greig in the leading role.

Future

Television adaptation
In January 2022, it was reported that Apple TV+ will be adapting the film into a television series with Gina Rodriguez set to star and executive produce.

See also
 List of submissions to the 61st Academy Awards for Best Foreign Language Film
 List of Spanish submissions for the Academy Award for Best Foreign Language Film

References

External links
 
 
 
 
 
 Women on the Verge of a Nervous Breakdown: A Sweet New Style – an essay by Elvira Lindo at The Criterion Collection

1988 films
1988 comedy-drama films
1988 independent films
1980s black comedy films
1980s feminist films
1980s Spanish-language films
Best Film Goya Award winners
El Deseo films
European Film Awards winners (films)
Films adapted into plays
Films about actors
Films based on works by Jean Cocteau
Films directed by Pedro Almodóvar
Films featuring a Best Actress Goya Award-winning performance
Films produced by Agustín Almodóvar
Films scored by Bernardo Bonezzi
Films set in Madrid
Films shot in Madrid
Spanish black comedy films
Spanish comedy-drama films
Spanish independent films
Toronto International Film Festival People's Choice Award winners